Hold on Hope is an EP by Guided by Voices, released March 7, 2000. The titular song was featured in an episode of the TV comedy Scrubs, in the episode 'My Occurrence'. Two songs on the EP are based on songs from the 1996 album Tonics & Twisted Chasers; "Idiot Princess" is an alternate version of "Reptilian Beauty Secrets", and "Do the Collapse" is an instrumental version of "Girl from the Sun".

Track listing
 "Underground Initiations" - 2:04
 "Interest Position" - 2:25
 "Fly Into Ashes" - 2:26
 "Tropical Robots" - 0:51
 "A Crick Uphill" 2:23
 "Idiot Princess" - 1:38
 "Avalanche Aminos" - 2:10
 "Do the Collapse" - 1:43
 "Hold on Hope" - 3:33

References

External links
 This EP at Guided by Voices Database (Or GBVDB)

2000 EPs
Guided by Voices EPs